Men's colleges in the United States are primarily those categorized as being undergraduate, bachelor's degree-granting single-sex institutions that admit only men. In the United States, male-only undergraduate higher education was the norm until the 1960s. The few remaining well-known men's colleges are traditional independent liberal arts colleges, though at present the majority are institutions of learning for those preparing for religious vocations.

History

Historically, many colleges in the United States were gender-segregated. Alfred University in upstate New York was founded in 1836 as a co-educational institution. Northwestern University and Washington University in St. Louis were some of the first men's colleges to begin admitting women, doing so in 1869. However, mixed-sex education did not become the norm until much later. Notably, Wesleyan University began to admit women in 1872, but abandoned the practice in 1912, when it became all-male once again, and would not admit women again until 1972.

By the 1960s, and particularly in 1969, most of the remaining male-only institutions began to admit women, including Georgetown University, Princeton University, Johns Hopkins University (women had previously been admitted to graduate programs only), and Yale University. Claremont McKenna College, then Claremont Men's College, started admitting women in 1976 after being founded as a men's college for World War II veterans on the G.I. Bill. Columbia College of Columbia University held out even longer, and did not admit women until 1983, three years after Haverford College admitted its first female students. By that point, most men's colleges had already disappeared from the American academic landscape.

The most notable men's college to begin admitting women in recent years is the Virginia Military Institute (VMI), which had been sued by the U.S. Department of Justice in 1990 for discrimination. The Department of Justice argued that since VMI was a public institution, it could not prevent women from attending based on gender alone. Due to United States v. Virginia, VMI admitted its first female cadets in 1997. Deep Springs College in California, an unusual two-year school that has only one or two dozen students, began admitting women in 2018.

Although most non-religious men's colleges now face the question of co-education, some new men's colleges have been proposed. One of the most frequently discussed is the Southern Military Institute, which has been proposed as a new men-only alternative to the now co-educational VMI and The Citadel, the latter of which admitted its first female students in 1993.

Today

Four-year men's colleges
, there are three private, non-religious, four-year, all-male college institutions in the United States. These are:
 Wabash College, Crawfordsville, Indiana
 Hampden–Sydney College, Hampden Sydney, Virginia
 Morehouse College, Atlanta, Georgia

In April 2019, Morehouse announced that it will begin admitting transgender men for the first time in 2020, becoming the first standalone all-male college in the U.S. to adopt a policy on transgender students.

Two-year men's colleges
Although it now offers associate's degrees, the Williamson Free School of Mechanical Trades was established as a free vocational school and is usually not considered a traditional men's college although it is a non-denominational independent institution that enrolls no women. Taking inspiration from Williamson, the Harmel Academy was opened in 2020 as a Catholic vocational school for men.

Religious seminaries
Additionally, many seminaries officially operate as men's colleges, though they are traditionally not frequently included in the lists of men's colleges. These include The Master's Seminary in Sun Valley, California; the Saint Meinrad School of Theology in Saint Meinrad, Indiana; and Holy Apostles College and Seminary in Cromwell, Connecticut.

Counterparts and coordinates
A few men's colleges exist as components of a larger co-educational institution or partnership. Such arrangements were formerly much more common, but most ended with a merger or with one or both institutions becoming co-educational in the second half of the twentieth century.

Some universities separate their undergraduate students into individual, gender-conscious colleges. Yeshiva University oversees the all-male Yeshiva College as well as the Stern College for Women. The University of Richmond has Richmond College for men and Westhampton College for women. At Tulane University, Tulane College was for men and H. Sophie Newcomb Memorial College was for women. The two have now merged due to the financial devastation to the university after Hurricane Katrina. In each of these cases, the individual colleges have their own residence systems, advisors, staff, student governments, and traditions separate from their male or female counterpart.

Several cases exist of men's colleges that are formally independent but have close academic relationships with women's colleges on adjacent campuses. Unlike the single-sex colleges at Yeshiva and Richmond, they are not considered to be two colleges within one larger university, but instead two independent colleges joined together in a partnership arrangement. Current examples include Hobart and William Smith Colleges in Geneva, New York and College of Saint Benedict and Saint John's University in Collegeville, Minnesota. As a member of Atlanta University Center, Morehouse has extensive cross-registration and resource sharing with Spelman College (all women) and Clark Atlanta University (coeducational).

Coeducational programs and services
As with many women's colleges, some men's colleges do have a limited number of coeducational programs and services. Saint Meinrad and Holy Apostles allow limited enrollment for lay women in specially designated courses, while Master's operates a Seminary Wives Discipleship program on its campus for ten weeks each semester. Hampden–Sydney provides a female-only guest house on its campus for college visitors.

List of men's colleges
As of April 2007, the College Board lists 66 colleges in the United States as officially being men's colleges. These are mostly Orthodox Jewish Rabbinical colleges (yeshivas), with a large concentration of Rabbinical colleges being located in the New York City metropolitan area.

According to the College Board's statistics, at least 15,183 men in April 2006 were attending the following institutions that are not open to female enrollment, with 13 schools not reporting their enrollment figures:

Traditional institutions
Hampden–Sydney College (Hampden–Sydney, Virginia)
Morehouse College (Atlanta, Georgia)
Saint John's University (Collegeville, Minnesota) 
Wabash College (Crawfordsville, Indiana)
Williamson College of the Trades, formerly Williamson Free School of Mechanical Trades (Media, Pennsylvania)

Religious vocational institutions

Christian
Conception Seminary College (Conception, Missouri)
Divine Word College (Epworth, Iowa)
Holy Trinity Orthodox Seminary (Jordanville, New York)
Mount Angel Seminary (St. Benedict, Oregon)
Pontifical College Josephinum (Columbus, Ohio)
St. Charles Borromeo Seminary (Wynnewood, Pennsylvania)
St. John Vianney College Seminary (Miami, Florida)
St. John Vianney College Seminary (St. Paul, Minnesota)
St. John's Seminary College (Brighton, Massachusetts)
St. Joseph Seminary College (St. Benedict, Louisiana)

Jewish
Beis Medrash Heichal Dovid (Far Rockaway, New York)
Beth Hamedrash Shaarei Yosher Institute (Brooklyn, New York)
Beth Hatalmud Rabbinical College (Brooklyn, New York)
Beth Medrash Govoha (Lakewood, New Jersey)
Central Yeshiva Tomchei Tmimim-Lubavitch (Brooklyn, New York)
Darkei Noam Rabbinical College (Brooklyn, New York)
Kehilath Yakov Rabbinical Seminary (Brooklyn, New York)
Machzikei Hadath Rabbinical College (Brooklyn, New York)
Mesivta Torah Vodaath Seminary (Brooklyn, New York)
Mirrer Yeshiva Central Institute (Brooklyn, New York)
Ner Israel Rabbinical College (Baltimore, Maryland)
Ohr Somayach Tanenbaum Education Center (Monsey, New York)
Rabbinical Academy Mesivta Rabbi Chaim Berlin (Brooklyn, New York)
Rabbinical College Beth Shraga (Monsey, New York)
Rabbinical College Bobover Yeshiva B'nei Zion (Brooklyn, New York)
Rabbinical College Ch'san Sofer of New York (Brooklyn, New York)
Rabbinical College of America (Morristown, New Jersey)
Rabbinical College of Long Island (Long Beach, New York)
Rabbinical College of Telshe (Wickliffe, Ohio)
Rabbinical Seminary Adas Yereim (Brooklyn, New York)
Rabbinical Seminary of America (Flushing, New York)
Shor Yoshuv Rabbinical College (Lawrence, New York)
Talmudic University of Florida (Miami Beach, Florida)
Talmudical Academy of New Jersey (Adelphia, New Jersey)
Talmudical Institute of Upstate New York (Rochester, New York)
Talmudical Seminary Oholei Torah (Brooklyn, New York)
Talmudical Yeshiva of Philadelphia (Philadelphia, Pennsylvania)
Telshe Yeshiva-Chicago (Chicago, Illinois)
Torah Teminah Talmudical Seminary (Brooklyn, New York)
U.T.A. Mesivta-Kiryas Jocl (Monroe, New York)
United Talmudical Seminary (Brooklyn, New York)
Yeshiva and Kolel Bais Medrash Elyon (Monsey, New York)
Yeshiva and Kollel Harbotzas Torah (Brooklyn, New York)
Yeshiva Beth Yehuda-Yeshiva Gedolah of Greater Detroit (Oak Park, Michigan)
Yeshiva College of the Nations Capital (Silver Spring, Maryland)
Yeshiva D'Monsey Rabbinical College (Monsey, New York)
Yeshiva Derech Chaim (Brooklyn, New York)
Yeshiva Gedolah Imrei Yosef D'Spinka (Brooklyn, New York)
Yeshiva Gedolah Rabbinical College (Miami Beach, Florida)
Yeshiva Gedolah Zichron Moshe (South Fallsburg, New York)
Yeshiva Karlin Stolin (Brooklyn, New York)
Yeshiva Mikdash Melech (Brooklyn, New York)
Yeshiva of Nitra (Mount Kisco, New York)
Yeshiva of the Telshe (Riverdale, New York)
Yeshiva Ohr Elchonon Chabad/West Coast Talmudical Seminary (Los Angeles, California)
Yeshiva Shaar Hatorah (Kew Gardens, New York)
Yeshiva Shaarei Torah of Rockland (Suffern, New York)
Yeshiva Toras Chaim Talmudical Seminary (Denver, Colorado)
Yeshivas Novominsk (Brooklyn, New York)
Yeshivath Beth Moshe (Scranton, Pennsylvania)
Yeshivath Viznitz (Monsey, New York)

Non-College Board

Although undergraduate institutions for men only, or admitting women only to special programs, these colleges are not officially listed as men's colleges by the College Board:

Holy Apostles College and Seminary (Cromwell, Connecticut)
The Master's Seminary (Sun Valley, California)
St. Basil College Seminary (Stamford, Connecticut)
Saint Meinrad School of Theology (Saint Meinrad, Indiana)
Yeshiva College, Yeshiva University (Washington Heights, Manhattan, New York)

See also
List of mixed-sex colleges and universities in the United States
List of defunct United States military academies
Men's colleges
Women's colleges in the United States

References

Notes